Christ Church, Barking or Christ Church, Thames View is a Church of England church on the Thames View estate in Barking, Greater London. It was built between 1958 and 1959 as a chapel of ease to St Patrick's. From the late 1970s until 1 January 2017 it formed a team parish with St Patrick's and St Margaret's.

References

External links
https://web.archive.org/web/20161020191107/http://christchurch-thamesview.org.uk/index.html
http://www.geograph.org.uk/photo/2376514
http://www.geograph.org.uk/photo/2376511

1959 establishments in the United Kingdom
Church of England church buildings in the London Borough of Barking and Dagenham